The Bahamas participated at the 2018 Summer Youth Olympics in Buenos Aires, Argentina from 6 October to 18 October 2018.

Athletics

The Bahamas qualified 5 athletes.

Swimming

The Bahamas qualified 2 athletes.

References

2018 in Bahamian sport
Nations at the 2018 Summer Youth Olympics
Bahamas at the Youth Olympics